León Artola was a Spanish screenwriter and film director. His family emigrated to Argentina when he was young, but he later returned to Spain. Artola directed seven films including Corner in Madrid (1936).

Selected filmography
 Mientras la aldea duerme (1926)
 El pollo pera (1926)
 La del Soto del Parral (1929)
 El suceso de anoche (1929)
 Sol en la nieve (1934)
 Rosario la cortijera (1935)
 Corner in Madrid (1936)

References

Bibliography 
 Labanyi, Jo & Pavlović, Tatjana. A Companion to Spanish Cinema. John Wiley & Sons, 2012.

External links 
 

1893 births
Year of death unknown
Spanish film directors
Spanish male screenwriters
Spanish male writers
People from El Bierzo
Spanish emigrants to Argentina